Venus (French:Vénus) is a 1929 French silent drama film directed by Louis Mercanton, and starring Constance Talmadge, André Roanne, and Jean Murat. It is based on a story by Jean Vignaud.

Cast
 Constance Talmadge as Princess Beatrice Doriani
 André Roanne
 Jean Murat as Le capitaine Franqueville
 Max Maxudian as Le prince Mario Zarkis
 Charles Frank
 Louis Baron fils as Le capitaine de Venus
 Frédéric Mariotti as Le chef des dockers
 Jean Mercanton as L'enfant
 Maurice Schutz
 Julio de Romero
 Anthony Hankey
 Desdemona Mazza

References

Bibliography
 Goble, Alan. The Complete Index to Literary Sources in Film. Walter de Gruyter, 1999.

External links 
 

1929 films
French drama films
French silent feature films
1929 drama films
1920s French-language films
Films directed by Louis Mercanton
French black-and-white films
Silent drama films
1920s French films